Conrad Adolphus Wallroth (12 May 1851 – 22 February 1926) was an English cricketer who played first-class cricket for Oxford University between 1872 and 1874, Kent in 1872 and Derbyshire in 1879. He was a right-handed batsman who occasionally kept wicket.

Wallroth was born in Lee, then in Kent. He was educated at Harrow School, playing in the Eton-Harrow match in 1870, and went on to study at Brasenose College, Oxford. In 1871 he made his first-class debut playing against Oxford University for MCC, and represented various other sides including Brasenose College and Gentlemen of England in that season. In the 1872 season he played for the Oxford University team including in the Varsity match, and at the end of the season put in an appearance for Kent. He played for Oxford University in 1873 when he scored 109 against Middlesex and appeared in the winning Varsity match side. Oxford won the Varsity match again in 1874, which was Wallroth's last season. In 1876 he appeared for the Gentlemen of the South, and by 1878 had moved to Derbyshire where he lived at Mickleover. He played a non-qualifying match against Uppingham for Derbyshire in 1878 and played three first-class games for Derbyshire in the 1879 season. He also played a number of games that year for the Harrow School old boys team, one of which was against Derbyshire when the Harrow Wanderers beat the county side. In 1880 he played a game for Gentlemen of Derbyshire against Gentlemen of Canada.

Wallroth, died at Compton Grange Godalming, Surrey at the age of 74. Wallroth's sister Louisa married Alfred Lubbock a Kent cricketer.

References

External links

1851 births
1926 deaths
People educated at Harrow School
Alumni of Brasenose College, Oxford
English cricketers
Oxford University cricketers
Derbyshire cricketers
Kent cricketers
People from Lee, London
Gentlemen of the South cricketers
Marylebone Cricket Club cricketers
Gentlemen of England cricketers
People from Mickleover
Cricketers from Derby